Nicholas Scott Harmer (born January 23, 1975) is an American musician, best known as the bass guitarist and occasional co-songwriter for the band Death Cab for Cutie.

Equipment

Basses
Lakland  Skyline Bob Glaub Signature  Black
Lakland  Skyline Bob Glaub Signature  White
Lakland  Skyline Bob Glaub Signature  Natural

Amps
Ashdown ABM 500 EVO II Head
Fender 2x15 Bass Cabinets

Discography
Death Cab for Cutie – Thank You for Today (2018, Atlantic Records) 
Death Cab for Cutie – Kintsugi (2015, Atlantic Records)
 Death Cab for Cutie – Codes and Keys (2011, Atlantic Records)
 Death Cab for Cutie – Narrow Stairs (2008, Atlantic Records, Barsuk Records)
 Death Cab for Cutie – Plans (2005, Atlantic Records, Barsuk Records)
 Death Cab for Cutie – Transatlanticism (2003, Barsuk Records)
 Death Cab for Cutie – The Photo Album (2001, Barsuk Records)
 Death Cab for Cutie – We Have the Facts and We're Voting Yes (2000, Barsuk Records)
 Death Cab for Cutie – Something About Airplanes (1998, Barsuk Records)
 Death Cab for Cutie – You Can Play These Songs with Chords'' (1997, Barsuk Records)

References

External links
 20 Questions to Nicholas Harmer from 2000.

1975 births
Alternative rock bass guitarists
American alternative rock musicians
American indie rock musicians
Death Cab for Cutie members
German emigrants to the United States
Living people
People from Kaiserslautern (district)
People from Puyallup, Washington
Musicians from Tacoma, Washington
Guitarists from Washington (state)
21st-century American bass guitarists